Bryngwyn (Welsh: "White hill") is a small village in the community of Beulah, Ceredigion, Wales. Bryngwyn is represented in the Senedd by Elin Jones (Plaid Cymru) and is part of the Ceredigion constituency in the House of Commons.

References

External links 
 British Towns.net

Villages in Ceredigion